Etihad Airways is the national airline of the United Arab Emirates and one of two flag carriers of the United Arab Emirates (the other being Emirates). Its head office is in Khalifa City, Abu Dhabi, near Abu Dhabi International Airport. Etihad commenced operations in November 2003. It is the second-largest airline in the UAE after Emirates. The name Etihad is Arabic for 'Union'.

The airline operates more than 1,000 flights per week to over 120 passenger and cargo destinations in the Middle East, Africa, Europe, Asia, Australia, and North America, with a fleet of 102 Airbus and Boeing aircraft as of February 2020. 
In 2015, Etihad carried 14.8 million passengers, a 22.3% increase from the previous year, delivering revenues of US$9.02 billion and net profits of US$103 million. Its main base is Abu Dhabi International Airport.

In addition to its core activity of passenger transportation, Etihad also operates Etihad Holidays and Etihad Cargo. Etihad established its airline alliance, Etihad Airways Partners, in October 2015 which was disbanded in 2018 after several of its members fell into financial difficulties. Etihad Airways holds minority equity investments in the participating airlines, as well as having had a stake in Virgin Australia, until its insolvency in April 2020 with no return on investment. Booking for these airlines was consolidated under one network.

History

Background 
The emirate of Abu Dhabi was a joint-owner of Gulf Air along with Bahrain, Qatar, and the Sultanate of Oman. Abu Dhabi International Airport was one of Gulf Air's bases and hubs from the 1970s until September 2005, when Abu Dhabi withdrew from the airline, leaving it an Oman and Bahrain-owned airline until the former's exit in 2007 to focus on Oman Air.

Foundation 
In July 2003, future UAE president Sheikh Khalifa bin Zayed Al Nahyan, who wanted an airline for Abu Dhabi, issued a Royal (Amiri) Decree that established Etihad Airways as the second flag carrier of the United Arab Emirates. His relation Sheikh Ahmed bin Saif Al Nahyan founded and started with an initial paid-up capital of AED500 million. Services were launched with a ceremonial flight to Al Ain on 5 November 2003. On 12 November 2003, Etihad commenced commercial operations with the launch of services to Beirut, Lebanon.

In June 2004, the airline placed a US$8-billion aircraft order for Six Boeing 777-200LRs and 24 Airbus aircraft, including 10 Airbus A380s. Its first A380 was delivered in December 2014.

In June 2008 at the Farnborough Airshow the airline announced an order for 35 Boeing 787s and ten 777s, options for 25 787s and ten 777s and purchase rights on ten 787s and five 777s.

Etihad reported its first full-year net profit in 2011, of US$14 million, in line with the strategic plan announced by CEO James Hogan in 2006.

Equity Alliance 
In December 2011, Etihad announced it had taken a 29.21% stake in Air Berlin, Europe's sixth-largest airline, and Hogan was appointed Vice Chairman. It followed this up with minority stakes in other airlines—Air Seychelles (40%), Aer Lingus (2.987%), Virgin Australia (10%). On 1 August 2013, the president of the company, Hogan, signed a deal with Aleksandar Vučić, First Deputy Prime Minister of Serbia, in Belgrade, giving Etihad a 49% stake in the Serbian national carrier Jat Airways. The Serbian Government retained 51% of the shares, with the company being rebranded as Air Serbia.

In September 2012, the Indian government announced that foreign airlines could take a stake of up to 49% in Indian carriers. On 24 April 2013, Jet Airways announced that it was ready to sell a 24% stake in the airline to Etihad for US$379 million. The deal was completed on 12 November 2013.

At the 2013 Dubai Airshow, Etihad announced that it was acquiring a 33.3% stake in the Swiss carrier Darwin Airline. Darwin was rebranded as Etihad Regional from March 2014. Etihad sold its stake in Darwin in 2017.

On 1 August 2014, Etihad agreed to take a 49% stake in the Italian flag carrier Alitalia for an estimated €560 million. The deal was closed on 8 August 2014. On 1 January 2015, Alitalia-CAI formally passed its operations to Alitalia-SAI, a new entity owned 49% by Etihad and 51% by the Alitalia-CAI shareholders.

In May 2016, the management structure was reshuffled, as Hogan became CEO of the airline's parent company, Etihad Aviation Group. Peter Baumgartner, formerly the airline's Chief Commercial Officer, became chief executive officer of the airline, reporting to Hogan. In December 2016 Handelsblatt Global reported that Hogan was going to be dismissed after a "failed spree of acquisitions in Europe."

On 24 January 2017, the Etihad Aviation Group Board of Directors announced that Hogan (along with Group CFO James Rigney) would be stepping down "in the second half of 2017". Peter Baumgartner, (former CEO of the airline), became the acting CEO of the airline as it faced mounting losses from its investments in Air Berlin and Alitalia. On 2 May 2017 Alitalia filed for bankruptcy. Hogan and Rigney left Etihad later that month. On 27 July Etihad reported a loss of US$1.873 billion for 2016. On 15 August Air Berlin filed for bankruptcy after Etihad withdrew its financial support.

As an interim measure, the board of directors appointed Ray Gammell as CEO (previously Chief People and Performance Officer) while searching for a permanent replacement. On 9 January 2018, Etihad Airways appointed Mark Powers as Group CFO, replacing interim Group CFO Ricky Thirion.

On 2 July 2017, the United States Department of Homeland Security unbanned Etihad Airways and exempted Etihad Airways from the 2017 electronics ban after the airline enhanced its passenger screening processes.

In June 2018 Etihad reported a net loss of US$1.52 billion for 2017.

In February 2019, Etihad announced large order cancellations for both Airbus and Boeing aircraft. The airline terminated contracts for all 42 Airbus A350-900s, 2 A350-1000s and 19 of 24 ordered Boeing 777X.

On 1 May 2021 it was announced Etihad Airways sold its 40% stake in Air Seychelles back to the Government of Seychelles.

Impact of COVID-19 
In May 2020, shortly after Air France retired its entire Airbus A380 fleet due to the COVID-19 pandemic, there were rumors that Etihad Airways was considering canceling all its remaining Airbus A350 orders and retiring its entire Airbus A380 fleet due to more financial losses caused by the COVID-19 pandemic. Etihad's CEO Tony Douglas said that Etihad's A380 fleet was very likely not to fly again in passenger service, and therefore are likely to be withdrawn after only 7 years in service. This move would make Etihad the third Airbus A380 operator to retire its Airbus A380 fleet, following Air France-KLM and Hi Fly Malta. However, by 26 May 2020, Etihad confirmed that the airline will not cancel its remaining Airbus A350 orders and plans to proceed with them. The airline also confirmed that it had no plans to ditch its Airbus A380 fleet into early retirement unlike Air France, despite the COVID-19 pandemic.

However, as of October 2020, some sources stated that the Etihad Airbus A380 still had a potential possibility of early retirement due to the aircraft market changes and demand caused by the COVID-19 pandemic as Douglas referred to the Airbus A380 as a heavily inefficient handicapped behemoth by two engines too many. Douglas also said that smaller long-range twin-jet aircraft such as the Boeing 777X, 787, and Airbus A350 can do the job far more efficiently and sustainably than that of the A380.

In February 2021, Etihad Airways vaccinated all its operating pilots and cabin crew against COVID-19, the first airline to vaccinate all its operating pilots and cabin crew.

Since most of Etihad's flights were grounded between March and June 2020, the airline posted a core operating loss of $1.7 billion in 2020, and the airline's passenger traffic dropped by 76% to 4.2 million.

Throughout 2020, due to the COVID-19 pandemic, Etihad Airways laid off over 1,000 cabin crew and pilots.

Etihad had reported significant losses even before the pandemic; since 2016, it lost over $5.62 billion and in 2019 losses amounted to $870 million. The airline's full-year losses amounted to $1.7 billion in 2020.

Company slogans

 From Abu Dhabi to the World – De facto slogan of Etihad Airways. 
 The World Is Our Home, You Are Our Guest – 2013
 Flying Reimagined – 2015. The global campaign was headed with a launch of a commercial filmed on location in Abu Dhabi featuring Nicole Kidman as Etihad ambassador and the Airbus A380 The Residence cabin.
 Choose Well – 2018

Corporate affairs

Head office
Etihad has its head office, in Khalifa City, Abu Dhabi, near Abu Dhabi International Airport. Etihad spent 183.6 million UAE dirhams (US$50 million) in 2007 to arrange to have its new head office and training center built. The new head office was scheduled to be finished by the end of 2007.

Structure

Etihad is governed by a board of directors chaired by Mohamed Mubarak Al Mazrouei, and operates in terms of its founding legislation and the Article of Association of the company. The Board consists of seven independent non-executive members and has two sub-committees, being an executive committee and an Audit Committee, each with its charter and chairman. Other members of the board include Ahmed Ali Al Sayegh, H.E. Mohamed Khalifa Al Mubarak, Mohamed Hareb Sultan Al Yousef, Hamad Abdulla Al Shamsi, Khalifa Sultan Al Suwaidi, and Ahmed Ali Matar Al Romaithi.

The airline was led previously by James Hogan (formerly CEO of Gulf Air) who was appointed as president and Chief Executive Officer on 10 September 2006 until January 2018. The current CEO of Etihad Group is Tony Douglas who was appointed as chief executive officer in January 2018.

Etihad Airways equity alliance
Etihad's equity alliance is composed of airlines in which Etihad has minority shareholdings:

 Air Serbia (18%)

The incorporated airlines were also part of the now-disbanded Etihad Airways Partners alliance between 2015 and 2018.

With Virgin Australia's bankruptcy and subsequent restructuring, the company's shareholding in the airline ended in its entirety.

In late December 2020, the government of Serbia recapitalized Air Serbia, increasing its stake to 82%, thus decreasing Etihad's stake to 18%.

Business trends
Key trends for Etihad Airways are shown below (as at years ending 31 December):

Profits*: Earlier profit/loss figures do not appear to have ever been published; the company announced, however, that it became profitable as from 2011.

Corporate sponsorship

Current team sponsorship deals

Event and organisations

 On 18 December 2007 Etihad announced that it would become the title sponsor for the 2009 Abu Dhabi Grand Prix to be held on Yas Island, the F1 logo and the words "Formula 1 Etihad Airways Abu Dhabi Grand Prix" appeared on the aircraft for one month before the race.
 In October 2008, it was announced that Etihad would take over sponsorship of the Docklands Stadium in Melbourne, Australia (previously known as the Telstra Dome). The name change to Etihad Stadium took effect on 1 March 2009.
 On 19 March 2008, it was announced that Etihad Airways would become a main sponsor for the All-Ireland Senior Hurling Championship from 2008 to 2010, which was later extended until 2012. On 12 April 2012, the Gaelic Athletic Association signed a new five-year sponsorship deal with Etihad.
 On 25 March 2014, Etihad announced a partnership with Major League Soccer (MLS) in the United States to become the Official Airline Partner of MLS, in a multi-year deal.
 Etihad Airways were the main sponsor for the 2015 Etihad Airways GAA World Games held in Abu Dhabi and the 2016 Etihad Airways GAA World Games held in Dublin. The sponsorship has since ceased.
 In 2017 it was announced that Etihad Airways would collaborate with IMG Models, on a show called Model Diaries, showcasing models in high fashion as they travel to fashion shows around the world. and in November 2018 its first episode featured high fashion model Xiao Wen Ju as she travelled to Dubai.

Former sponsorships
 Etihad was a sponsor of UAE sports clubs, including the Abu Dhabi Rugby Union Football Club, the Abu Dhabi International Sailing School and the Abu Dhabi International Marine Sports Club (ADIMSC), as well as the Al-Jazira Club.
 It also had sponsored the two Arena Football League teams, the Baltimore Brigade & Washington Valor, before the league went bankrupt & dissolved in 2019.

Cargo

Etihad Cargo, formerly Etihad Crystal Cargo, is the dedicated freight operations branch of Etihad. The carrier refreshed its brand image in June 2012 dropping the "Crystal" part, with full Etihad Cargo titles now applied billboard-style in line with the airline's current corporate design.

Etihad Cargo operates six Boeing 777Fs. It has previously operated a Boeing 747-400F and Boeing 747-8F, both leased from Atlas Air but operated in full Etihad Cargo colours. In January 2018, Etihad announced it would retire and either sell or lease out its five relatively new Airbus A330-200F freighters due to a change in strategy and reduction of freight capacity. In August 2018, it was announced that all five A330 freighters had been sold to DHL Aviation.

Etihad Cargo delivered 368,000 tonnes of cargo in 2012, a tonnage growth of 19 percent on the back of a capacity increase of 14 percent in available tonnage kilometres. Etihad's new facility at Abu Dhabi International Airport is equipped to handle more than 500,000 tonnes annually.

In September 2018, Etihad Cargo announced a revised and heavily downsized network of cargo destinations to reflect the reduced fleet and a focus on core freight operations.

Destinations

As of June 2019, Etihad serves 81 passenger and cargo destinations across Africa, Europe, North America, Asia and Australia from its hub at Abu Dhabi International Airport. Until terminating the São Paulo service in late March 2017, Etihad Airways was one of the few carriers to have passenger services to all six inhabited continents.

As 2021 began, the airline suspended its flights to South Africa as a part of its ongoing review of network performance. Etihad opened a twice-weekly route to Tel Aviv, Israel, in April 2021.

Codeshare agreements
Etihad Airways has codeshare agreements with the following airlines:

 ACP Rail International (railway)
 Aegean Airlines
 Aer Lingus
 Aeroflot
 Air Arabia Abu Dhabi
 Air Canada
 Air Europa
 Air France
 Air Malta
 Air New Zealand
 All Nippon Airways
 Asiana Airlines
 Avianca
 Bangkok Airways
 Brussels Airlines
 China Eastern Airlines
 EgyptAir
 El Al
 Garuda Indonesia
 Gulf Air
 ITA Airways
 JetBlue
 KLM
 Korean Air
 Kuwait Airways
 Lufthansa
 Middle East Airlines
 Oman Air
 Pakistan International Airlines
 Precision Air
 Royal Air Maroc
 Royal Jordanian
 Saudia
 SNCF (railway)
 SriLankan Airlines
 Swiss International Air Lines
 Turkish Airlines
 Virgin Australia

Fleet

Etihad Airways operates a fleet of both narrow body and widebody aircraft from four aircraft families Airbus A320neo family, Airbus A350-1000, Boeing 777 and Boeing 787 Dreamliner totaling 81 aircraft.

Livery

Current livery 
The current livery – Facets of Abu Dhabi – was unveiled in September 2014 on the first of the airline's new A380s. It features a golden and silver triangular tessellation on the vertical stabilizer and rear fuselage. A golden Etihad logo and a UAE emblem over the windows, with the UAE flag painted on the front door. The background was painted in light beige and the wingtip also has a UAE emblem. The golden colour was inspired by the colour of the Arabian desert.

Former livery (2003–2017) 
The former livery features a UAE flag and a falcon emblem on the vertical stabilizer and a golden Etihad logo on the windows. Red and golden stripes were painted on the fuselage. This livery is still present on a few Boeing 777-300ERs and Airbus A320s.

Special liveries

Countries liveries

Services

New cabins (from December 2014)
With the introduction of the Airbus A380 and Boeing 787, new cabins were introduced, their names being: The Residence (A380 only), the First Apartments (A380 only), First Suite (787-9 only), Business Studio and Economy Smart seat. The rest of the fleet will gradually be retrofitted with these cabins except for the Residence and First Apartment cabins, which are exclusive to the Airbus A380. The Residence was the only three-room cabin on any airline when it was introduced in December 2014.
The Residence (Airbus A380 only)
It features a private living room, bedroom, and bathroom. It features a -wide two-seater reclining sofa and  TV monitor in the lounge; an ensuite bathroom with shower, an -long, -wide double bed in the bedroom which also includes a  TV monitor, and a personal butler.
First Apartment (Airbus A380 only)
First Class on Airbus A380s was overhauled with the "First Apartments". There are nine in total, configured 1-1 across a single aisle, and take up a total area of  each. It features a -wide reclining chair; a full-length ottoman which can be transformed into a bed; a  TV monitor which can swing to align itself to the ottoman so that it can be viewed from the bed; a vanity cabinet; and a bar with assorted chilled drinks. In 2015, this class was named the world's best first class due to its luxurious innovation.
First Suite (Boeing 787–9 only)
Some Boeing 787-9s have eight First Suites to accommodate the narrower aircraft. The service includes a -wide reclining lounge chair (which converts into an  fully flat bed); dining table; and a  TV monitor. All covers are tailored by Poltrona Frau. There is a personal wardrobe, along with total privacy with high sliding doors.
Business Studio
The "Business Studio" is on both models, with 70 seats on the Airbus A380s, 28 on the Boeing 787-9s, and 32 on the Boeing 787-10s. The studio seats include a -wide reclining chair, which converts into a fully flat bed, and an  TV monitor. All have leather covers tailored by Poltrona Frau. It is featured in a 1-2-1 seating style so all seats have direct aisle access.
Economy Smart Seat
Economy Smart seats feature a -wide seat on the Boeing 787s and -wide seat on the Airbus A380s, with a  pitch and  recline. There is also an  touch screen fitted with Etihad's entertainment system. It uses a 3-4-3 seating style on the Airbus A380s, and 3-3-3 seating style on the Boeing 787s.

Choose Well
In 2018 Etihad Airways announced its new brand platform named "Choose Well" which allows guests to make choices about how they travel in terms of airport services, luggage allowance, seats and the addition of Buying On Board service.

In-flight entertainment
Etihad uses both the Panasonic eX2 and the Thales TopSeries i5000 in-flight entertainment system with AVOD (audio-video on demand) system on its new long-range aircraft and on some of its new A320-200 aircraft. Etihad brands this system as the "E-box". International destination fleets have a plug-and-play system which works on USB technology, that allow passengers to play their own audio, video and picture media. The Boeing 777-300ER aircraft have in-flight telephones.

On 28 April 2019 Etihad announced that it would remove seat-back screens in the economy section of 23 of its narrow-body Airbus A320 and A321 aircraft, used for flights of up to 5 hours.

Etihad signed a new 10-year agreement with Panasonic Avionics Corporation in 2011 for the provision of in-flight entertainment including broadband internet and live TV.

Atlas is the official in-flight magazine of the airline.

Loyalty program
Etihad Guest is the airline's frequent flyer program, launched on 30 August 2006. It offers a discount web shop for members and multiple benefits and perks such as extra baggage and priority check-in for frequent fliers. Points may also be redeemed for tickets or class upgrades. As part of an agreement between Etihad and the United Arab Emirates Ministry of Community Development, senior Emirati citizens get instant access to Etihad's loyalty programme and are entitled to perks of more air miles, discounted tickets, priority check-in, and extra baggage.

As part of a partnership with American Airlines, American Airline loyalty program AAdvantage may be redeemed for tickets on Etihad. Similar partnership exists for the Scandinavian Airlines loyalty program Eurobonus, where members can earn and spend bonus points on selected flights.

Etihad guest loyalty members are rewarded with Etihad miles when they book accommodations through booking.com as a result of a deal inked between booking.com and Etihad airways in 2019.

Accidents and incidents
 Etihad Airways had not suffered any fatal accidents during passenger operations.
15 November 2007 – A new A340-600, registration A6-EHG, due for delivery to Etihad Airways was damaged beyond repair during ground testing at Airbus' facilities at Toulouse Blagnac International Airport in France. During a pre-delivery engine test, multiple safety systems had been disabled by engineers, leading to the non-chocked aircraft accelerating to 31 knots (57 km/h) and colliding with a concrete blast deflection wall. Severe damage was inflicted on the aircraft and nine people on board were injured, four of them seriously. The right wing, tail, and left engines made contact with the ground or wall, leaving the forward section of the aircraft elevated several meters and the cockpit broke off.

Use of biofuel
Etihad Airways flew the world's first Boeing 787 Dreamliner commercial flight using locally produced jet fuel derived from salicornia plant on 15 January 2019. The flight flew from Abu Dhabi to Amsterdam. The aviation biofuel was researched and developed by Sustainable Bioenergy Research Consortium (SBRC), a non-profit entity established by Masdar Institute, part of the Khalifa University of Science and Technology. The 787 engine was powered by General Electric's next-generation GEnx-1B engines and flew for more than seven hours, taking off from Abu Dhabi and arriving in Amsterdam. It is a Boeing 787-10 Dreamliner nicknamed "Greenliner" and is registered as A6-BMH.

See also
 Emirates (airline)
 Abu Dhabi International Airport
 List of airlines of the United Arab Emirates
 List of airports in the United Arab Emirates

Notes

References

External links

 Official website

 
Emirati companies established in 2003
2003 establishments in the United Arab Emirates
Airlines established in 2003
Airlines of the United Arab Emirates
Arab Air Carriers Organization members
Companies based in Abu Dhabi
Emirati brands
Etihad Airways Partners
Government-owned airlines
Government-owned companies of the United Arab Emirates
Transport in Abu Dhabi